The ancient Egyptian Adze on a Wood Block, or Axe in a Block of Wood hieroglyph, Gardiner sign listed no. U20, is a portrayal of the adze. It is used mostly in the cartouches of pharaonic names especially, or other important names.

The adze on block has the Egyptian language value of stp and is the verb "choose". It is used as a determinative  in 'stp', "cut into pieces", and as an ideogram for 'stp', "choose", "choice".

The adze tool sign, Gardiner nos. U18 and U19, U19, U20, portray just the adze, (or hand-axe).

Cartouche usage: "chosen of"
The most common usage of this hieroglyph is for a descriptor with the names in the pharaonic cartouche. An example for Ramesses II, shows his prenomen as: <-ra-wsr-mAat-stp*ra:n-> UserMaatRe SetepeNRe, and is approximately: Maat's Power of Ra, (the) Chosen of Ra. (i.e. Maat's Powerful and Chosen (one) of Ra)

See also
Gardiner's Sign List#U. Agriculture, Crafts, and Professions
List of Egyptian hieroglyphs
Adze#Africa

References

Betrò, 1995. Hieroglyphics: The Writings of Ancient Egypt, Maria Carmela Betrò, c. 1995, 1996-(English), Abbeville Press Publishers, New York, London, Paris (hardcover)
Collier and Manley, 1998. How to Read Egyptian Hieroglyphs: A Step-by-Step Guide to Teach Yourself, Mark Collier (Egyptologist), and Bill Manley, c 1998, University of California Press, 179 pp, (with a word Glossary, p 151-61: Title Egyptian-English vocabulary; also an "Answer Key", 'Key to the exercises', p 162–73) (hardcover)

Egyptian hieroglyphs: agriculture-crafts-and-professions
Egyptian hieroglyphs: arts and trades